Melinda Jane Wagner (born 1957 in Philadelphia) is a US composer, and winner of the 1999 Pulitzer Prize in music. Her undergraduate degree is from Hamilton College. She received her graduates degrees from University of Chicago and University of Pennsylvania. She also served as Composer-in-Residence at the University of Texas (Austin) and at the 'Bravo!' Vail Valley Music Festival. Some of her teachers included Richard Wernick, George Crumb, Shulamit Ran, and Jay Reise.

Career
A resident of Ridgewood, New Jersey, Wagner won the 1999 Pulitzer Prize for her Concerto for Flute, Strings and Percussion. The Chicago Symphony has commissioned three major works, Falling Angels (1992); a piano concerto, Extremity of Sky (2002) for Emanuel Ax; the most recent of these, Proceed, Moon (2016), was premiered by the orchestra under the baton of Susanna Mälkki in 2017. Extremity of Sky has also been performed by Emanuel Ax with the National Symphony, the Toronto Symphony, the Kansas City Symphony, and the Staatskapelle Berlin. Other works have been performed by a number of orchestras, including the New York New Music Ensemble, the Network for New Music, Orchestra 2001, the San Francisco Contemporary Music Players, and many other leading organizations.

She has received many honorable mentions, including a Guggenheim Memorial Foundation Fellowship and awards from the American Academy of Arts and Letters and three ASCAP Young Composer awards. Beforehand, she also received an honorary degree from Hamilton College. Some of her famous pieces are the Trombone Concerto (2007), Falling Angels (1992), and Extremity of Sky (2002).

Wagner was also commissioned by the New York Philharmonic (a concerto for principal trombonist Joseph Alessi), from the Chamber Music Society of Lincoln Center, the Barlow, Fromm, and Koussevitzky Foundations, the American Brass Quintet, and from guitarist David Starobin. She has received a Guggenheim Memorial Foundation Fellowship, an award from the American Academy of Arts and Letters, an honorary degree from Hamilton College, as well as a Distinguished Alumni Award from the University of Pennsylvania. Her other performances include the Dallas Symphony, the American Composers Orchestra, the Women's Philharmonic, the New York Pops, and the US Marine Band.

Wagner has held a faculty position at The Juilliard School since 2016. A passionate and inspiring teacher, Wagner has held faculty positions at Brandeis University, Smith College, and Syracuse University. Wagner has also taught at many universities including the University of Pennsylvania, Swarthmore College, Syracuse University, and Hunter College. She has lectured at many schools such as Yale University, Cornell University, Juilliard School, and Mannes School of Music. Wagner has served as Composer-in-Residence at the University of Texas Austin and at the Bravo! Vail Valley Music Festival. She currently resides in New Jersey with her husband, percussionist James Saporito, and their children.

Partial list of works 
Falling Angels (1992)
Concerto for Flute, Strings, and Percussion (Pulitzer Prize winner - 1999)
Extremity of Sky (piano concerto - 2002)
Concerto for Trombone and Orchestra (2007)
Arabesque for Solo Guitar
Noggin: Four Pieces for Piano
Tintinnabulum for Piano
Brass Quintet No. 1
Concertino for Harpsichord and String Quintet
Four Settings for Soprano and Ensemble
My Tioga for String Quartet
Pan Journal for Harp and String Quartet
Proceed, Moon for orchestra (2016)
Romanze With Faux Variations Piano Trio No. 2
Scritch for Oboe and String Quartet
Sextet for Flute, Clarinet, Violin, Viola, Cello, Piano
Seven Muses Contemporary Anthology for Flute and Piano
Sleep Awake: Two Songs for Mezzo-soprano, Clarinet, and Piano
Wick for Chamber Ensemble 
Wing and Prayer for Clarinet, violoncello, percussion, and piano
Ancient Music SABTA Acapella
From a Book of Early Prayers for SATB Acapella
57/7 Dash Overture for Timpani, Percussion, and orchestra
Little Moonhead three tributaries to Bach
Scamp for Wind Ensemble

Awards 

 2003: Distinguished Alumni Award from the University of Pennsylvania 
 2001: Honorary degree from Hamilton College 
 2000: Award from the American Academy of Arts and Letters 
 1999: Pulitzer Prize in Music for Concerto for Flute, Strings, and Percussion 
 1991: MacDowell Colony Resident Fellowship 
 1988: Guggenheim Memorial Foundation Fellowship 
 1988: MacDowell Colony Resident 
 1986: MacDowell Colony Resident 
 1986: Yaddo Resident Fellowship
 1984, 1985, 1987: ASCAP Young Composer Awards

References

External links 
 Art of the States: Melinda Wagner
Melinda Wagner's page at Theodore Presser Company
Two Interviews with Melinda Wagner, February 4, 1993 & May 21, 2003

1957 births
Living people
20th-century classical composers
American women classical composers
American classical composers
American people of German descent
People from Ridgewood, New Jersey
Pulitzer Prize for Music winners
Musicians from Philadelphia
Hamilton College (New York) alumni
Pulitzer Prize winners
20th-century American women musicians
20th-century American composers
Classical musicians from Pennsylvania
Classical musicians from New Jersey
20th-century women composers
American women academics
Swarthmore College faculty
Syracuse University faculty
Hunter College faculty
University of Pennsylvania faculty
University of Texas at Austin faculty
Members of the American Academy of Arts and Letters